Chamí Emberá a.k.a. Chami is an Embera language of Colombia.

Phonology

Consonants

Vowels

Notes

Languages of Colombia
Choco languages